"16 Days" is a song by alternative country band Whiskeytown and written by Ryan Adams.  It first appeared on Whiskeytown's Strangers Almanac album in 1997, and was released that same year as a CD single.  An earlier version of the song – recorded during the band's "Baseball Park" sessions – was released on the 1998 reissue of the band's first album Faithless Street.  And an alternate, acoustic version of the song – also recorded during the "Baseball Park" sessions – was released on the 2008 deluxe edition of Strangers Almanac.

According to Ryan Adams, the song was released as a single and was getting significant radio airplay until, in a fit of anger, he dared a powerful West Coast radio programmer to take the song off the air.  The programmer obliged, and the song soon disappeared from radio playlists.

Cover versions
The song has been covered by The Clarks on their album Songs in G.

The song has also been covered by Wade Bowen as a hidden track on his Blue Light Live album

Track listing

Personnel and production credits
 Ryan Adams —  acoustic & electric guitars, singing, banjo, piano, percussion
 Phil Wandscher —  electric guitar, singing, organ, percussion
 Caitlin Cary —  violin, singing
 Steven Terry —  drums, singing, percussion
 Jeff Rice —  bass guitar
 Produced, engineered, and mixed by Jim Scott

References

Whiskeytown songs
1997 debut singles
Songs written by Ryan Adams
1997 songs